SS Europa, later SS Liberté, IMO 5607332, was a German ocean liner built for the Norddeutsche Lloyd line (NDL) to work the transatlantic sea route. She and her sister ship, were the two most advanced, high-speed steam turbine ocean vessels in their day, with both earning the Blue Riband.

After World War II French line Compagnie Générale Transatlantique was awarded  the Europa as a war prize to replace the destroyed , which had caught fire and capsized at her moorings while interned by the United States in New York City. She was laid up in 1962 and scrapped at La Spezia, Italy, in 1963.

History

Construction
Europa was built in 1928 with her sister ship  to be the second 50,000–gross ton North German Lloyd liner. They both were powered with advanced high-speed steam turbine engines and were built with a bulbous bow entry and a low streamlined profile.

Europa and her slightly larger sister ship were designed to have a cruising speed of 27.5 knots, allowing an Atlantic crossing time of 5 days. This enabled Norddeutsche Lloyd to run regular weekly crossings with two ships, an operation that previously required three.

The launching of Europa took place at Blohm & Voss shipyard, Hamburg on Wednesday, August 15, 1928. Europa was intended to be completed in spring 1929. However, on the morning of 26 March 1929, a fire broke out while still at the equipment dock. The fire raged all day long and it was not until the evening when the fire was under control. The ship's turbines were damaged heavily and also the remainder of the ship had been significantly damaged. After long discussions between builder and shipping company, it was decided to repair the ship. Within eleven months the ship was finished and completed on February 22, 1930. The cause of the fire has never been clearly identified.

Blue Riband
During the voyage many of her passengers were disturbed by the soot coming out of Europas low funnels. The problem was corrected by raising the funnels by 15 feet, though decreasing her low profile. After they were raised, there were no more complaints. She held the Riband until Bremen recaptured it in June 1933.

Aircraft

Like Bremen, Europa had a small seaplane launched from a catapult on her upper deck between the funnels. The airplane flew from the ship to a landing at the seaplane port in Blexen.

The catapult was removed from both Bremen and Europa after a few years of service.

World War II

Europa was inactive for most of World War II. There were plans to use her as a transport in Operation Sea Lion, the intended invasion of Great Britain, and later conversion to an aircraft carrier. None of these plans came to pass, and in 1945, she was captured by the Allies and used as a troopship, sailing as the USS Europa (AP-177). The US Navy  ensign who was handed the German captain’s pistol as the sign of surrender was a 28 year old surnamed Dolin. The United States claimed the ship as a war prize on 8 May 1945 and gave the vessel to the US Navy, which commissioned Europa 25 August 1945. Europa cleared Bremerhaven on 11 September 1945 for Southampton, England, where she loaded 4,500 homeward-bound American troops, arriving in New York City on 24 September. After alteration to increase her troop-carrying capacity, she made two voyages to Southampton to bring US servicemen home to the United States. She sailed from New York once more, on 15 March 1946, bound for Kirkwall in the Orkney Islands, and Bremerhaven, where she moored on 24 March.

Europa suffered from small fires caused by the removal of the ship's original high-quality fittings and installation of inferior replacements to compensate for material shortages in the war effort. Also, several serious hull cracks were discovered. The vessel was decommissioned on 2 May 1946 and delivered to the State Department on 8 June 1946. She was later transferred to France in partial payment of war reparations.

French Line

After World War II French line Compagnie Générale Transatlantique was awarded  the Europa as a war prize to replace the destroyed , which had caught fire and capsized at her moorings while interned by the United States in New York City. Europa was taken to Le Havre for refitting – which proved fraught with difficulties. She was raised in April 1947 and towed to the Ateliers et Chantiers de Saint-Nazaire Penhoët shipyard in Saint-Nazaire to complete her refitting. She suffered some further damage when the ship caught fire once again in October 1949, resulting in damage to some of her passenger space. Finally, on August 2, 1950, wearing CGT black-topped red funnels in place of NDL yellow, she made her maiden voyage to New York under her new name, Liberté'''. After five years and two near disasters the crossing was uneventful, and she went on to serve as the premier transatlantic liner in the French Line fleet until the arrival of the 66,000-ton  in 1961. Liberté was laid up in 1962 and scrapped at La Spezia, Italy, in 1963.Liberté was featured prominently in the Jane Russell film The French Line. Liberté made an appearance in the opening credits of the 1953 film How to Marry a Millionaire, as well as the 1954 classic film Sabrina, starring Audrey Hepburn and Humphrey Bogart, in the final scenes of the film.

Route

 Bremerhaven – New York (as Europa)
 Le Havre – New York (1950 on as Liberté'')

References

Further reading

External links
 
 Steamship EUROPA, Maiden Voyage, March 1930 (Fox Movietone with Sound)

1928 ships
E
Blue Riband holders
Ships built in Hamburg
Ships of Norddeutscher Lloyd
Ships of the Compagnie Générale Transatlantique
Steamships of France
Steamships of Germany
Proposed aircraft carriers
Ship fires
Captured ships
Troop ships
Maritime incidents in 1929
Maritime incidents in 1946
Maritime incidents in 1949
Maritime incidents in 1950
Maritime incidents in 1953